Fußball-Club Ingolstadt 2004 e.V., commonly known as FC Ingolstadt 04 or FC Ingolstadt, is a German football club based in Ingolstadt, Bavaria. The club was founded in 2004 out of the merger of the football sides of two other clubs:  ESV Ingolstadt-Ringsee 1919 and MTV Ingolstadt 1881.

History

ESV Ingolstadt

ESV Ingolstadt (Eisenbahner-Sportverein Ingolstadt-Ringsee e.V.) was founded in 1919 as FC Viktoria. Two years later the football players of Turnverein 1861 Ingolstadt joined the club to form VfR Ingolstadt. A number of other clubs from the Ringsee district fused with this club, but to little effect. The club's achievement amounted to not more than a couple of seasons spent in the Gauliga Bayern in 1936–38. After World War II, the club was re-constituted as VfR Ingolstadt, changed its name to Erster Sportverein Ingolstadt (First Sports Club Ingolstadt) in 1951 and then changed it again to its current form in 1953 when "E" came to stand for Eisenbahner to reflect its affiliation with the railway.

ESV Ingolstadt joined the Regionalliga Süd (II) in 1963 when the Bundesliga – Germany's professional football league – was formed. After bouncing between tiers II and III, capped with two seasons spent in 2. Bundesliga Süd from 1979 to 1981, the club began a descent through tier III to Landesliga Bayern-Süd (IV), last playing in 1993–94. The sports club itself carried on until it went bankrupt in the summer of 2004 and those football players there were left to join FC Ingolstadt 04. ESV continues to operate today offering a number of other sports activities while acknowledging FC 04 on its website.

MTV Ingolstadt

MTV Ingolstadt (Männer-Turn-Verein von 1881 Ingolstadt) is the city's largest sportsclub with 3,400 members and has an on-and-off relationship with its football side. The club was founded in 1881 and took up football in 1905. The footballers set up a separate club in 1924, but returned to the fold in 1933 at the direction of sports authorities in the Third Reich. After World War II occupying Allied authorities ordered the dissolution of all organizations in Germany, including sporting associations. The club was re-founded as Städtischer SV Ingolstadt 1881. Their original name was restored in 1948.

MTV spent two seasons in 2. Bundesliga Süd after Amateurliga Bayern champion 1. FC Haßfurt declined promotion in 1978. When ESV faced bankruptcy in 2004, MTV allowed its footballers to leave to help form FC Ingolstadt.

Current
In 2004–05, newly formed FC Ingolstadt began play in the Oberliga Bayern (IV) and managed to finish second in their first season. Their success continued in 2005–06 when they captured the divisional title and won promotion. They finished their debut Regionalliga Süd (III) campaign 2006–07 with a fifth-place result. League restructuring was planned for the 2008–09 season with the introduction of a national third division and FC would have to finish their 2007–08 Regionalliga season in the top 10 to qualify. They exceeded that goal by finishing second and advancing to the 2. Bundesliga.

Ingolstadt won its debut second division match, but the following months proved less successful for the club and by the mid-winter break they had dropped to 12th place. The latter half of the season proved even worse with the club only realizing 1 win in 18 matches. They finished the season in 17th place and were subsequently relegated to the 3. Liga.

FC delivered a steady performance in third division play and ended their campaign in third place. A new promotion/relegation format accompanied the introduction of the 3. Liga and the club's finish earned them a play-off versus Hansa Rostock which had finished in 16th (third last) place in the 2. Bundesliga. Ingolstadt won both legs of the two match play-off and returned to the second division alongside the top two third tier teams which advanced automatically by virtue of their finishes.

On 17 May 2015, they clinched the 2014–15 2. Bundesliga title and won promotion for the first time in their history to the Bundesliga. Ingolstadt finished 11th in the 2015-16 Bundesliga, but the following year they fell to 17th and were relegated back to the 2. Bundesliga.

In the 2018–19 2. Bundesliga, Ingolstadt finished 16th and lost the relegation playoff against SV Wehen Wiesbaden on away goals.

In the 2019–20 3. Liga qualified for the promotion playoffs, but suffered more heartbreak, as a last second goal from Fabian Schleusener saw Ingolstadt lose to FC Nürnberg on away goals.

In the 2020–21 3. Liga, Ingolstadt were once again part of the relegation playoffs, and a 3-0 win over VfL Osnabrück in the first leg gave them the advantage heading into the second leg. Despite a 3-1 loss in the second leg, Ingolstadt won 4-3 on aggregate, and won promotion to the 2021–22 2. Bundesliga. The club were relegated back to the 3. Liga on the 31st matchday after a 2-2 draw against Karlsruhe.

Reserve team

FC Ingolstadt 04 II played the 2011–12 season in the Regionalliga Süd after finishing runners-up in the Bayernliga and taking FC Ismaning's promotion spot after the later declined promotion. In the 2012–13 season the team played in the new Regionalliga Bayern.

Club culture
The club nickname Die Schanzer has a military background, meaning trenchmen or rampartmen. The official club anthem is called "Schanzer Herz", performed by Ingolstadt-based hard rock band Bonfire. The stadium's goal theme song is "Esellied", performed by South Tyrol band Volxrock. The pre-kick-off song is "Thunderstruck" by AC/DC.

Players

Current squad

Honours

League
 2.Bundesliga (II)
 Champions: 2014–15
 Regionalliga Süd (III)
 Runners-up: 2008
 Bayernliga (IV)
 Champions: 2006
 Runners-up (2): 2005, 2011‡
 Landesliga Bayern-Süd (V)
 Runners-up: 2008‡
 Bezirksoberliga Oberbayern (VI)
 Runners-up: 2006‡

Cup
 Bavarian Cup
 Runners-up: 2005
 Oberbayern Cup
 Winner: 2005, 2006, 2007

Youth
 Under 19 Bayernliga
 Champions: 2015
 Under 17 Bayernliga
 Champions: 2013
 Under 15 Bayernliga
 Champions: 2014, 2016

Women
 Bezirksoberliga Oberbayern
 Winner: 2015–16‡

 ‡ Reserve team

Recent managers
Source:

FC Ingolstadt 04 seasons

Source:

First team

Reserve team

With the introduction of the Regionalligas in 1994 and the 3. Liga in 2008 as the new third tier, below the 2. Bundesliga, all leagues below dropped one tier. With the establishment of the Regionalliga Bayern as the new fourth tier in Bavaria in 2012 the Bayernliga was split into a northern and a southern division, the number of Landesligas expanded from three to five and the Bezirksoberligas abolished. All leagues from the Bezirksligas onwards were elevated one tier.

Key

DFB Cup appearances
The club has qualified for the first round of the German Cup ten times and the third round just once:

References

External links

Official team site (ESV Ingolstadt)
Official team site (MTV Ingolstadt)
The Abseits Guide to German Soccer
FC Ingolstadt 04 at Weltfussball.de

 
Football clubs in Germany
Football clubs in Bavaria
Association football clubs established in 2004
Football in Upper Bavaria
2004 establishments in Germany
FC Ingolstadt 04
Bundesliga clubs
2. Bundesliga clubs
3. Liga clubs